Phitsanulok provincial and local government are the administrative bodies for Phitsanulok province, one of Thailand's seventy-six provinces, which lies in lower northern Thailand, with a population of 865,247 (2019 census). The provincial capital is the city of Phitsanulok, where the main government offices are situated. The province is mainly rural in nature, with 68.2% of inhabitants living in the countryside, with only 31.8% in small towns and cities, most of which have populations of less than 15,000. Agriculture is the most important sector of the economy, contributing 28% of GPP and employing 42% of the labour force, with sugar cane, rice, cassava and maize being the main crops, alongside a wide variety of fruit and vegetables. Tourism and hospitality, unlike in coastal provinces, play only a limited role, generating a mere 1% of provincial GPP.

Phitsanulok provincial government

Phitsanulok province, with a registered population as of 31 December 2019 of 865,247 is led by a governor and is divided into 9 districts (amphoe). Each district is led by a districts chief (nai amphoe). Governor, district chiefs and district clerks are appointed by the central government. There are 93 subdistricts (tambon) each led by a subdistrict chief (kamnan), further divided into 1,050 villages (muban) each led by a village chief (phu yai ban). Subdistrict chiefs and village chiefs are elected by local citizens.

Population
The total population of Phitsanulok province is 865,247, of which Mueang Phitsanulok district is the most densely populated district with 291,311 people. Wang Thong district also has a population of more than 100,000 people. The remaining seven districts have a population of 35,000 to 95,000, of which Wat Bot district is the less densely populated district with 37,694 people.

Population density of Phitsanulok province is 80 people per square kilometer (207 people per sq.mi.), of which Mueang Phitsanulok district has the highest density with 388 people per square kilometer (1,005 people per sq.mi.) and Chat Trakan district the lowest density with 26 people per square kilometer (68 people per sq.mi.)

Revenue taxes
The total personal income tax, corporate income tax, value added tax (VAT), specific duties, stamp duties and others for Phitsanulok province amounts to 1,440.7 million baht (US$46.4 million) for fiscal year 2019.
Mueang Phitsanulok District has the largest share of the revenue taxes (82%) with 1,186.7 million baht (US$38.3 million).
The remaining eight districts have the smallest share of the revenue taxes (18%) with 254 million baht (US$8.1 million).

Mueang Phitsanulok district

Nakhon Thai district

Chat Trakan district

Bang Rakam district

Bang Krathum district

Phrom Phiram district

Wat Bot district

Wang Thong district

Noen Maprang district

Phitsanulok local government

, there are: one Phitsanulok Provincial Administrative Organisation - PPAO ( - abbreviated ) and 26 municipal (thesaban) areas in the province. Phitsanulok has city (thesaban nakhon) status, Aranyik has town (thesaban mueang) status and 24 subdistrict municipalities (thesaban tambon). The non-municipal areas are administered by 76 Subdistrict Administrative Organisations - SAO (ongkan borihan suan tambon).All mayors, chiefs and councillors are directly elected by the local citizens. Municipalities have communities (chumchon), although not directly chosen by the local citizens, which provides advice and recommendations to local administrative organisations. They also promote and support community participation and enterprises at the district level and subdistrict villages.

Urban areas
Urban population in Phitsanulok province is 274,802 (31.8%) There is one urban area with more than 150,000 inhabitants: centered around the city of Phitsanulok. An urban area around Bang Rakam has more than 30,000 people. There are also seven urban areas with 7,000 to 13,000 people. Furthermore, there are six urban areas with less than 5,500 people, of which Phrom Phiram is the smallest with about 1,100 people.

Municipal/non-municipal areas
Of the total population of Phitsanulok province, 31.8% live in municipal areas. In Mueang Phitsanulok district, this is 54.4% of the people. Between 30% and 50% in three districts live in municipal areas. In two districts this is between 20% and 25%. Finally, it is less than 15% in three districts, with Wang Thong district having the lowest rate at 3.8%.

Revenues and expenditures
For FY2019, the revenues and expenditures for the three separate entities are as follows:

The total revenue for Phitsanulok Provincial Administrative Organisation is 1,120.1 million baht (US$36.1 million) and the total amount of the expenditure is 921.7 million baht (US$29.7 million).The profit amounts to 198.4 million baht (US$6.4 million).

The total revenue for all municipalities amounts to 1,349.0 million baht (US$43.5 million) and the amount of the total expenditure is 1,470.0 million baht (US$47.4 million). The deficit comes up to 121 million baht (US$3.9 million).

The total revenue for all Subdistrict Administrative Organisations is 3,597.1 million baht (US$116 million) and the total expenditure is 3,145.5 million baht (US$101.5 million). The profit corresponds to 451.6 million baht (US$14.5 million).

Mueang Phitsanulok district

Nakhon Thai district

Chat Trakan district

Bang Rakam district

Bang Krathum district

Phrom Phiram district

Wat Bot district

Wang Thong district

Noen Maprang district

References

Provinces of Thailand